is a large cemetery located north of Ueno in Yanaka 7-chome, Taito, Tokyo, Japan. The Yanaka sector of Taito is one of the few Tokyo neighborhoods in which the old Shitamachi atmosphere can still be felt. The cemetery is famous for its beautiful cherry blossoms that in April completely cover its paths, and for that reason that its central street is often called Cherry-blossom Avenue.

Description
Although renamed over 85 years ago, the cemetery is still often called by its old official name, and not Yanaka Reien. It has an area of over 100 thousand square meters and hosts about 7 thousand graves. The cemetery has its own police station and a small walled enclosure dedicated to the Tokugawa clan, family of the 15 Tokugawa shōguns of Japan, which however is closed to the public and must be peeked at through double barred gates. The last shōgun Tokugawa Yoshinobu, also known as Keiki, rests here.

The cemetery used to be part of a Buddhist temple called , and its central street used to be the road (sandō) approaching it. At about the middle point of the central street are the ruins of the five-storied pagoda that became the model for Kōda Rohan's novel The Five-Storied Pagoda. The pagoda had been a donation made in 1908 by Tenno-ji itself. The five-storied pagoda was burned one summer night in 1957 in the Yanaka Five-Storied Pagoda Double-Suicide Arson Case and was later declared a historical landmark by the city authorities.

History
After the Meiji Restoration, the government pursued a policy of separation of Buddhism and Shinto (Shinbutsu bunri), and Shinto funerals became more common. This posed however a problem because until then most cemeteries had been property of Buddhist temples. The solution adopted was the opening of public burial grounds. In 1872, Meiji authorities confiscated a portion of Tennō-ji and declared it a public Tokyo cemetery, the largest in the country at the time. In 1935 the name was changed from Yanaka Bochi to the present (Yanaka Reien).

Notable burials
 Arisaka Nariakira
 Ichirō Hatoyama
 Ichiyo Higuchi
 Momoko Kochi
 Oden Takahashi
 Shibusawa Eiichi
 Murata Tsuneyoshi
 Tokugawa Yoshinobu
 Nicholas of Japan

Access
The cemetery lies 1 minute from JR's Nippori Station and 5 minutes from JR's Nishi-Nippori Station and Uguisudani Station.

Gallery

References 
 谷中霊園, Japanese Wikipedia
 Edward Seidensticker: Low City, High City: Tokyo from Edo to the Earthquake: how the shogun's ancient capital became a great modern city, 1867-1923
 お墓の歴史

External links 

 

Parks and gardens in Tokyo
Neighborhoods of Tokyo
Cemeteries in Japan
Hanami spots of Japan
Taitō